Eththiligoda Vidana Gamage Pubudu Chathuranga, (born 12 November 1982), popularly as Pubudu Chathuranga, is an actor in Sri Lankan cinema, theater and television. He is also worked as a model, TV presenter and a screenplay writer.

Personal life
Pubudu was born on 12 November 1982 in Kithulampitiya, Galle. His mother, Lalitha Indrani Weththasinghe, is a housewife born in Colombo who moved to Galle after marrying his father, E.V.G Somasiri, in the 1970s. He has one sister, Dushanthi Thamodini who is married to Sisira Kalansooriya. The name Pubudu means "blossoming of wisdom", and Chathuranga stands for any four noble things. 

Pubudu attended Richmond College in Galle, which his father had also attended. As a school boy he has won the primary best student award of his school and got the best results in Ordinary Level. After Advanced Level He was selected to receive higher education as a candidate for a Higher National Diploma in Engineering (HNDE), and he moved to Colombo. However, he became more involved in the arts field than the engineering field.

Since 2016, he has been dated to model Mashi Siriwardene. In 2017, Mashi crowned as NSBM Avurudu Kumariya. They married on 15 March 2018 where the ceremony was held at Cinnamon Grand Hotel, Colombo. Mashi later became an actress, who made a supportive appearances in the films The Newspaper and Nihanda Sewaneli.

Career
His school drama performances started in grade 1, where he acted in a comedic street play, Mahadana Muththa. At the age of fourteen, he appeared in  other stage dramas at the school, including ten English plays, for example Julius Caesar. Pubudu organized his own theater group when he was in grade 12 and carried out his own theatrical productions, such as Miriguwa and Histhanak. He started his career by appearing on stage in Trojan Kanthavo by Dharmasiri Bandaranayake. He then moved to television with a teledrama Samanala Kandawura directed by Prof. Ariyarathna Athugala. Pubudu became popular, landing recurring roles in TV series such as the soap opera Sara (2006). Chathuranga won best actor award at Raigam Tele'es for his role in One Way. He also won award for tele drama Kanyawi and nominated several times as the most popular actor in TV.

He made his film debut in 2004 with the comedic youth film Hiripoda Wassa and received his first notable critical award for this performance through the Sarasaviya Awards. Pubudu obtained recognition for his subsequent work in supporting roles in Tharaka Mal (2006) and Dancing Stars (2007), as well as a leading role in Kanyavi (2007), for which he received a merit award from SIGNIS Awards. In 2008, he made an international appearance in Uberto Pasolini's award winning movie Machan. He has been nominated for best actors awards several times, and won the Best Actor (2012) in The Derana Lux Film awards for his performance in the movie Challenges in 2011 for the character Ranuk, a teenager who is facing the challenges of becoming an adult, directed by Udayakantha Warnasuriya. He has also won the Best Actor Award in 2017 at Raigam Tele'es for his character 'Dr. Thejana', a psychiatrist in the television drama One Way directed by Lalith Rathnayake in 2016.

The teledrama 'Ran Samanalayo' in which Pubudu made lead role became the most popular teledrama in Sri Lanka for two years. Chathuranga has also been awarded Best Actor in a negative role in 2018 for his performance in the film Sakkarang directed by a veteran director Dharmasena Pathiraja. He has won the best outstanding auxiliary actors award in SIGNIS award for his outstanding performance in the movie Parawarthana. In 2019, he won the best actor in a Comedy role for the movie Maya 3D in Presidential Film Awards. Other than these major achievements he has nominated many times and won several award in other award ceremonies as well.

Since the 2000s, Pubudu has appeared in 20 movies with locally and internationally recognized directors. His stage career became successful after he appeared in Nari Burathi (2012), where he played the main role. His writing career started in childhood and prospered after he wrote the movie Sara, It is the first Sri Lankan movie which is written based out of a TV serial. As a scriptwriter, he wrote the popular blockbusters Pravegaya and Maaya 3D.

He also appeared as a TV presenter, with successful musical chats such as Sikurada Rae (Derana TV). He also hosted Hiru Golden Film Awards two times. In addition, teledramas such as Suddi, Kasiwatta and Modarawella became very popular in 2019.

Notable teledramas
 Aaliya (2021)
 Adisi Nadiya 
 Bhavanthara (2014) 
 Bindunu Sith (2012)
 Devliye (2017)
 Gajamuthu (2008) 
 Lokkaiya (2007)
 Modara Walla (2017)
 Namak Nati Minisa (2011) 
 One way (2016) 
 Ran Samanalayo (2010)
 Sapthambaraye Diga Dawasak (2021) 
 Sara (2006) 
 Sudde (2019)
 Visi Eka (2021) 
 Wasanthaya Aran Evith (2008)

Filmography

Awards

31st Sarasaviya Awards

|-
|| 2006 ||| Hiripoda Wassa || Merit Award ||

SIGNIS Awards

|-
|| 2009 ||| Kanyavi || Merit Award ||

19th Presidential Awards

|-
|| 2016 ||| Maya 3D || Best Actor in a Comedy Role ||

Raigam Tele'es

|-
|| 2017 ||| One Way || Best Teledrama Actor ||

Derana Film Awards

|-
|| 2012 ||| Challenges || Best Actor || 
|-
|| 2017 ||| Sakkarang || Best Actor in a Negative Role ||

References

External links
Pubudu Chathuranga
පුබුදු චතුරංග ගේ අම්මා ලලිතා ඉන්ද්‍රානි වෙත්තසිංහ

1982 births
Living people
21st-century Sri Lankan male actors
People from Galle
Sri Lankan male stage actors
Sri Lankan male television actors
Sinhalese male actors
Sri Lankan screenwriters
Sri Lankan television personalities